Thomas Sankara: The Upright Man (French: Thomas Sankara, l'homme intègre) was a 2006 documentary film about the Thomas Sankara, former president of Burkina Faso. Thomas Sankara was known as "the African Che", and became eminent in Africa due to his altruistic beliefs. Sankara acquired the presidency at a young age of 34 and served as president of Burkina Faso from 1983 to 1987. 

He renamed the country from the French colonial Upper Volta to Burkina Faso, "Land of Upright Men." This film sheds light on the impact that Sankara and his politics made on Burkina Faso and Africa in general.

The film recovers for the present a detailed history of Sankara's brief four-year rule and his revolutionary program for African self-reliance as a defiant alternative to the neo-liberal development strategies imposed on Africa by the West, both then and today.

References

External links
 

2006 films
French documentary films
2006 documentary films
Documentary films about revolutionaries
Documentary films about politicians
2000s French-language films
History of Burkina Faso
Documentary films about African politics
2000s French films